The 1891–92 FA Cup was the 21st staging of the world's oldest football cup competition, the Football Association Challenge Cup, commonly known as the FA Cup. West Bromwich Albion won the competition, beating Aston Villa 3–0 in the final at the Kennington Oval, with Wembley Stadium still 30 years away from being built.

Matches were scheduled to be played at the stadium of the team named first on the date specified for each round, which was always a Saturday. Some matches, however, might be rescheduled for other days if there were clashes with games for other competitions or the weather was inclement. If scores were level after 90 minutes had been played, a replay would take place at the stadium of the second-named team later the same week. If the replayed match was drawn further replays would be held until a winner was determined. If scores were level after 90 minutes had been played in a replay, a 30-minute period of extra time would be played.

Calendar

Qualifying rounds
For information on the matches played from the preliminary round to the fourth qualifying round, see 1891–92 FA Cup qualifying rounds.

Results

First round

Second round

Third round

Semifinals

The original semifinal matches were played on February 27, 1892. Aston Villa comfortably came through their tie with Sunderland 4–1 but West Bromwich Albion and Nottingham Forest drew their match 1–1. The tie went to a replay, again played at Molineux, but again finished 1–1. A second replay was needed to separate the teams, played in Derby and this time West Bromwich Albion came through winners 6–2 to reach the final against Aston Villa.

Final

The 1892 FA Cup Final was a football match played on 19 March 1892 at the Kennington Oval. The final was contested by West Bromwich Albion and Aston Villa. West Brom won 3–0, with goals from Alf Geddes, Nicholls and John Reynolds.

References
General
The FA Cup Archive at TheFA.com
English FA Cup 1891/92 at Soccerbase

Specific

 
1891-92
FA
FA